Body image is a person's thoughts, feelings and perception of the aesthetics or sexual attractiveness of their own body. The concept of body image is used in a number of disciplines, including neuroscience, psychology, medicine, psychiatry, psychoanalysis, philosophy, cultural and feminist studies; the media also often uses the term. Across these disciplines, there is no single consensus definition, but broadly speaking body image consists of the ways people view themselves; their memories, experiences, assumptions, and comparisons about their own appearances; and their overall attitudes towards their own respective heights, shapes, and weights—all of which are shaped by prevalent social and cultural ideals.

Body image can be negative ("body negativity") or positive ("body positivity"). A person with a negative body image may feel self-conscious or ashamed, and may feel that others are more attractive. In a time where social media holds a very important place and is used frequently in our daily lives, people of different ages are affected emotionally and mentally by the appearance and body size/shape ideals set by the society they live in. These standards created and changed by society created a world filled with body shaming; the act of humiliating an individual by mocking or making critical comments about a person's physiological appearance. There are differences of body shaming someone and yourself, according to anad.org "We are our own worst critic" which means that we judge and see our own flaws more than anyone else. We body shame ourselves by judging or comparing ourselves to someone else.

Aside from having low self-esteem, sufferers typically fixate on altering their physical appearances. Such behavior creates body dissatisfaction and higher risks of eating disorders, isolation, and mental illnesses in the long term. In Eating Disorders, a negative body image may also lead to body image disturbance, an altered perception of the whole one's body. Body dissatisfaction also characterizes body dysmorphic disorder, an obsessive-compulsive disorder defined by concerns about some specific aspect of one's body (usually face, skin or hair), which is severely flawed and warrants exceptional measures to hide or fix. Often, people who have a low body image will try to alter their bodies in some way, such as by dieting or by undergoing cosmetic surgery. On the other hand, positive body image consists of perceiving one's figure clearly and correctly, celebrating and appreciating one's body, and understanding that one's appearance does not reflect one's character or worth.

Many factors contribute to a person's body image, including family dynamics, mental illness, biological predispositions and environmental causes for obesity or malnutrition, and cultural expectations (e.g., media and politics). People who are either underweight or overweight can have poor body image. However, when people are constantly told and shown the cosmetic appeal of weight loss and are warned about the risks of obesity, those who are normal or overweight on the BMI scale have higher risks of poor body image.  "We expected women would feel worse about their bodies after seeing ultra-thin models, compared to no models if they have internalized the thin ideal, thus replicating previous findings."

A 2007 report by the American Psychological Association found that a culture-wide sexualization of girls and women was contributing to increased female anxiety associated with body image. An Australian government Senate Standing Committee report on the sexualization of children in the media reported similar findings associated with body image. However, other scholars have expressed concern that these claims are not based on solid data.

History 

In Ancient Egypt, the perfect woman was said to have a slender figure, with narrow shoulders, and a tall waist. Ancient Greece focused more on the male figure, but its female ideal was full-figured and plump with fair skin tones. Han Dynasty China primarily emphasized the face, skin, and hair. Ideal traits included clear, white skin; long, dark hair; and, for men, a stalwart frame. Any feature that implied social status or wealth was ideal.

During the Italian Renaissance, a wife's appearance was taken as an important reflection of her husband's status; size was linked to wealth, and so the ideal wife was held to have full hips and an ample bosom. The Victorian Era witnessed a similar movement, but the popularity of the waist-cinching corset led to the desirability of the hourglass figure. In the 1900s U.S. fashion and media industries celebrated the Gibson Girl: slim and tall, with a large bust and wide hips, but a narrow waist. These girls were also often shown in magazines such as Harper's Bazaar and LIFE, which resulted in a link between trendy fashions and styles, and the maintenance of active lifestyles and healthy well-beings

After World War I, the Gibson Girl transformed into the Flapper, an ideal type which dominated the period of the "Roaring Twenties". Women transitioned towards androgynous looks, in which hair styles were kept short, and brassieres were worn to flatten the chest. Loose clothing was also a trend, as it downplayed the waist by lowering it below the navel, resulting in a straight boyish figure.

Dress sense became more casual as well, perhaps reflecting a postwar relaxation of social and political tension, and a reaction against the matronly image of the women behind the alcohol Prohibition movement in the USA. With advertisements increasingly advocating the need to achieve a thinner frame, many women therefore pursued diets and exercise. Although slimmer body types were favoured, a sporty and healthy appearance was still prized above the frail and sickly look from the Victorian Era.

Austrian neurologist and psychoanalyst Paul Schilder coined the phrase 'body-image' in his book The Image and Appearance of the Human Body (1935).

The 1930s and 1940s witnessed the devastating effects of the second World War. While men were out on the battlefield, women began entering the workforce. This resulted in more formal and traditional military dress styles for women, which caused another shift in body image. While waists remained thin but prominent, the media embraced a more curvaceous look similar to the hourglass figure, through the addition of broad shoulders and large breasts as well.

Since this era was part of the golden age of Hollywood, many celebrities continued to influence this trend by wearing tight-fitting clothing that emphasized their figures. Pin-up girls and sex symbols radiating glamour soon followed in the 1950s, and the proportions of the hourglass figure expanded. Notable names include Marilyn Monroe and Sophia Loren. In order to achieve this ideal figure, women consumed weight-gain supplements. The release of Playboy magazine and the Barbie doll during this era reinforced this ideal.

Depictions of the perfect woman slowly grew thinner from the 1960s onward. The "Swinging Sixties" saw a similar look to the Flapper with the emergence of high-fashion model Twiggy, who promoted the thin and petite frame, with long slender legs, and an adolescent but androgynous figure. Other characteristics include, small busts, narrow hips, and flat stomachs. Many women either underwent diets or switched to weight-loss supplements to achieve the new look. This eventually resulted in an increase in anorexia nervosa during the 1970s.

Greater importance was soon placed on fitness. Actress Farrah Fawcett introduced a more toned and athletic body type. The exercise craze continued in the 1980s with Jane Fonda and the release of workout videos, motivating women to be thin but fit and svelte. This era also saw the rise of tall, long-legged supermodels, such as Naomi Campbell and Cindy Crawford, who set a new beauty standard for women around the world.

In the 1990s, supermodel Kate Moss popularized the stick-thin figure instead. The fashion industry pushed her image further with the heroin chic look, which dominated the catwalks during that time.: waifish appearances, bony structures, thin limbs, and an androgynous figure. Although this extreme period was short-lived, the 2000s saw the rise of the Victoria's Secret models, who altered beauty norms to include slim but healthy figures, with large breasts and bottoms, flat and visible abs, and prominent thigh gaps.  More women pursued cosmetic surgery practices, on top of diets and exercise regimes, to attain the perfect appearance.

As of 2017, efforts to promote a better body image have included an emphasis on fitness and plus-size models in the fashion and media industries. However, the advancement of technologies and pressures from the media have led to even greater importance being placed on the way we look as an indication of our personal value.

Advancements in communication technology have resulted in a "platform of delivery in which we intercept and interpret messages about ourselves, our self-worth, and our bodies." Social media in particular has reshaped the "perfect body". Apps and filters retouch images to make people look beautiful, often with inconsistent ideals for hair, body type, and skin tone.

According to a study by Dove, only 4% of women thought they were beautiful, while approximately 70% of women and girls in the UK believed the media's portrayal of impractical beauty standards fueled their appearance anxieties. As a result, the U.S. Department of Health and Human Services reported that, 91% of women were mostly unhappy with their bodies, while 40% will consider cosmetic surgery to fix their flaws.

Demographics

Women

"Social currency for girls and women continues to be rooted in physical appearance". Women "all over the world are evaluated and oppressed by their appearances", including their ages, skin tones, or sizes.

Many advertisements promote insecurities in their audiences in order to sell them solutions, and so may present retouched images, sexual objectification, and explicit messages that promote "unrealistic images of beauty" and undermine body image, particularly in female audiences.

Body dissatisfaction creates negative attitudes, a damaging mentality, and negative habits in young women. 

The emphasis on an ideal female body shape and size is especially psychologically detrimental to young women, who may resort to grooming, dieting, and surgery in order to be happy. A negative body image is very common among young adult women. "The prevalence of eating disorder development among college females is especially high, with rates up to 24% among college students."  Body dissatisfaction in girls is associated with increased rate of smoking and a decrease in comfort with sexuality when they're older, which may lead them to consider cosmetic surgery.

Global eating disorder rates such as anorexia and bulimia are gradually rising in adolescent girls. The National Eating Disorders Association, reported that 95% of individuals who suffer from an eating disorder are aged 12 to 26, and anorexia is the third-most-common illness among teenagers. Teenage girls are most prone "to internalize negative messages and obsess about weight loss to obtain a thin appearance".

The pressure on women and girls "to cope with the effects of culturally induced body insecurity" is severe, with many reporting that "their lives would be better if they were not judged by their looks and body shape, [as] this is leading to low self-esteem, eating disorders, mental health problems and depression."

"Cultural messages about beauty (i.e. what it is, how it should be cultivated, and how it will be rewarded) are often implicitly conveyed through media representations of women."

Women who compare themselves to images in the media believe they are more overweight than they actually are. One reason for this is because "idealised media images are routinely subjected to computer manipulation techniques, such as airbrushing (e.g. slimming thighs and increasing muscle tone). The resulting images present an unobtainable 'aesthetic perfection' that has no basis in biological reality."

However, other researchers have contested the claims of the media effects paradigm. An article by Christopher Ferguson, Benjamin Winegard, and Bo Winegard, for example, argues that peer effects are much more likely to cause body dissatisfaction than media effects, and that media effects have been overemphasized. It also argues that one must be careful about making the leap from arguing that certain environmental conditions might cause body dissatisfaction to the claim that those conditions can cause diagnosable eating disorders.

When female undergraduates were exposed to depictions of thin women their body satisfaction decreased; when they were exposed to larger models, it rose. Many women engage in "fat talk" (speaking negatively about the weight-related size/shape of one's body), a behavior that has been associated with weight dissatisfaction, body surveillance, and body shame. Women who overhear others using fat talk may also experience an increase in body dissatisfaction and guilt.

Monteath and McCabe found that 44% of women express negative feelings about both individual body parts and their bodies as a whole. 37.7% of young American males and 51% of young American females express dissatisfaction with their bodies.

In America, the dieting industry earns roughly 40 billion dollars per year. A Harvard study (Fat Talk, Harvard University Press) published in 2000 revealed that 86% of teenage girls are on a diet or believe they should be on one. Dieting has become common even among very young children: 51% of 9- and 10-year-old girls feel better about themselves when they are on diets.

Men 
Similarly, media depictions idealizing a muscular physique have led to body dissatisfaction among young men. As many as 45% of teenage boys may suffer from Body Dysmorphic Disorder (BDD), a mental illness whereby an individual compulsively focuses on self-perceived bodily flaws. Men may also suffer from muscle dysmorphia and may incessantly pursue muscularity without ever becoming fully satisfied with their physiques.

Research shows that the greatest impact on men’s criticism of their bodies comes from their male peers, including likeminded individuals or potentially people they admire who are around the same age, as opposed to romantic partners, female peers, or male relatives like fathers or brothers.

18% of adolescent males were most worried about their weights and physiques (Malcore, 2016); 29% frequently thought about their appearances.; 50% had recently complained about the way they looked.

25% of males report having been teased about their weight, while 33% specify social media as the source for self-consciousness. Following celebrities on social media sites makes it possible to interact personally with celebrities, which has been shown to influence male body image. A number of respondents also admitted to being affected by negative body talk from others.

The ideal male body is perceived to feature a narrow waist and hips, broad shoulders, a well-developed upper body, [and] toned "six-pack" abs. The figure may be traced back to an idealized male doll, G.I. Joe. The "bulked-up action heroes, along with the brawny characters in many video games, present an anatomically impossible ideal for boys, much as Barbie promotes proportions that are physically impossible for girls."  Boys who are exposed to depictions of muscular warriors who solve problems with their fists may internalize the lesson that aggression and muscles are essential to masculinity.

53% of boys cited advertisements as a "major source of pressure to look good; [though] social media (57%) and friends (68%) exerted more influence, while celebrities (49%) were slightly less persuasive". In spite of this, 22% of adolescent boys thought that the ideals depicted by the media were aspirational, while 33% called them healthy.

Some studies have reported a higher incidence of body dissatisfaction among Korean boys and girls than among boys and girls living in the United States, while noting that these studies fail to control for the slimmer and smaller size of Koreans as compared with Westerners. A cross-cultural analysis of the United States and South Korea focusing on social media found that between South Korean men and American men, Korean men are more concerned with their body image in relation to their social media use.

Many teenage boys participate in extreme workouts and weight training, and may abuse supplements and steroids to further increase muscle mass. In 2016, 10.5% acknowledged the use of muscle-enhancing substances, while 5 to 6% of respondents admitted to the use of steroids. Although dieting is often overlooked, a significant increase in eating disorders is present among men. Currently, 1 out of 4 men suffer from eating disorders, while 31% have admitted to purging or binge eating in the past.

Men often desire up to 26 pounds of additional muscle mass. Men who endorse traditional masculine ideas are more likely to desire additional muscle.  The connection between masculinity and muscle can be traced to Classical antiquity.

Men with lower, more feminine waist–hip ratios (WHR) feel less comfortable and self-report lower body esteem and self-efficacy than men with higher, more masculine, WHRs.

Gender differences 
Although body dissatisfaction is more common in women, men are becoming increasingly negatively affected. In a longitudinal study that assessed body image across time and age between men and women, men placed greater significance on their physical appearances than women, even though women reported body image dissatisfaction more often. The difference was strongest among adolescents. One theory to explain the discrepancy is that women have already become accustomed and desensitized to media scrutiny.

Studies suggest that the significance placed upon body image improved among women as they got older; men in comparison showed little variation in their attitude. Another suggested that "relative to men, women are considerably more psychologically aware of their appearances. Moreover, women's greater concern over body image has a greater impact on their daily lives."

As men and women reach older age, body image takes on a different meaning.  Research studies show that the importance attached to physical appearance decreases with age.

Weight 

The desire to lose weight is highly correlated with poor body image. Kashubeck-West et al. reported that when considering only men and women who desire to lose weight, sex differences in body image disappear.

In her book The Beauty Myth, Naomi Wolf reported that "thirty-three thousand women told American researchers they would rather lose ten to fifteen pounds than achieve any other goal." Through repeated images of excessively thin women in media, advertisement, and modeling, thinness has become associated with not only beauty, but happiness and success. As Charisse Goodman put it in her article, "One Picture is Worth a Thousand Diets", advertisements have changed society's ideas of beauty and ugliness: "Indeed to judge by the phrasing of the ads, 'slender' and 'attractive' are one word, not two in the same fashion as 'fat' and 'ugly.'"

Research by Martin and Xavier (2010) shows that people feel more pressure from society to be thin after viewing ads featuring a slim model. Ads featuring a larger sized model resulted in less pressure to be thin. People also felt their actual body sizes were larger after viewing a slim model as compared to a larger model.

Many, like journalist Marisa Meltzer, have argued this contemporary standard of beauty to be described as anorexic thinness, an unhealthy idea that is not representative of a natural human body: "Never before has the 'perfect' body been at such odds with our true size."

However, these figures do not distinguish between people at a low or healthy weight who are in fact overweight, between those whose self-perception as being overweight is incorrect and those whose perception of being overweight is correct.

Post-1997 studies indicate that around 64% of American adults are overweight, such that if the 56%/40% female/male dissatisfaction rates in the Psychology Today study have held steady since its release, those dissatisfaction rates are if anything disproportionately low: although some individuals continue to believe themselves to be overweight when they are not, those persons are now outnumbered by persons who might be expected to be dissatisfied with their bodies but are not.

In turn, although social pressure to lose weight has adverse effects on some individuals who do not need to lose weight, those adverse effects are arguably outweighed by social pressure's positive effect on the overall population, without which the recent increases in obesity and associated health and social problems (described in both popular and academic parlance as an "obesity epidemic") would be even more severe than they already are.

Overweight children experience not only discrimination but overall body dissatisfaction, low self-esteem, social isolation and depression. Because of the negative stigma, the child may suffer severely from emotional and physical ailments that could persist past childhood into adulthood.

Race 
The association of light skin with moral virtue dates back at least to the medieval era, and was reinforced during the Atlantic slave trade. The medieval theory that all races had originated from the white race was an early source of the longstanding association of white bodies and beauty ideals with "normality," and other racial phenotypes as aberrant. The 1960s Black is Beautiful movement explicitly attempted to end that mindset.

A lack of black women in the fashion industry contributes to body image issues among African-American women. However, a 2003 experiment presented 3 photographs of attractive white, black and Asian women to white, black and Asian students. The study concluded that Asian women and white women both reported similar levels of body dissatisfaction, while the black women were less dis-satisfied with their own appearances. These findings are consistent with previous research showing that black women generally have higher self-esteem than white or Asian women in America.

One study found that, among women, East Asian women are more satisfied with their bodies than white women. East Asian men however reported more body dissatisfaction than white males did.

Western men desire as much as 30 pounds more muscle mass than do Asian men.

Sexuality 
There is no scientific consensus on how a person's sexuality affects their body image. For example, a 2013 study found that lesbian-identifying women reported less body dissatisfaction than did heterosexual women. In contrast, a 2015 study found no differences in weight satisfaction between heterosexual and lesbian and bisexual women, and no differences in the amount of pressure to be thin they experienced from the media, sexual partners, friends or family. This research did find that heterosexual women were more likely to have internalised the thin ideal (accepted the Western concept that thinness equals attractiveness) than lesbian and bisexual women. Lesbian and bisexual women have said that while they are often critical of mainstream body size/shape ideals these are still the ideals that they feel social pressure to conform to. In a study conducted in 2017, Henrichs-Beck and Szymanski claimed that lesbian gender definition within the lesbian culture may dictate whether or not they are dissatisfied with their bodies. They suggested that lesbians who identified as more stereotypically 'feminine' were at greater risk of body dissatisfaction, while those who identified as more 'butch', were traditionally more satisfied with their bodies. Qualitative research with non-heterosexual women found that female sexual/romantic partners were a source of both body confidence and concerns. These women reported that while they compared their body size and shape to that of their partner, and could feel more self-conscious if their partner was slimmer than them, their attractions to women who did not conform to the narrow Western definition of ‘beauty’ gave them confidence in their own appearance.

A 2005 study found that gay men were more likely than straight men to have body image dissatisfaction, diet more, and were more fearful of becoming fat. There is some evidence to link the sexual objectification of gay males and heterosexual females by men in general as a reason for increased numbers in these groups for eating disorders and stimulants addictions. Bisexual people have historically been overlooked within body image research, either subsumed under gay/lesbian labels or ignored completely.

Causes

The fashion industry 
Fashion industry insiders argue that clothes hang better on tall, thin catwalk models, but critics respond that an overemphasis on that body type communicates an unhealthy and unrealistic body image to the public.

Fashion magazines directed at females subtly promote thinness and diet practices, and teenagers heavily rely on them for beauty and fashion advice. Seventeen in particular recorded one of the highest number of articles devoted to appearances; 69% of girls reported that it had influenced their ideal body shapes. 50% of advertisements featured also used beauty appeal to sell products. The U.S. Department of Health and Human Services reported that 90% of teenage girls felt a need to change their appearances, and that 81% of 10-year-olds were already afraid of being fat. According to a survey by the Manchester Metropolitan University, "self-esteem and views of body image suffered after the participants were shown magazine pictures of models, [suggests] that media portrayal of images can prolong anorexia and bulimia in women and may even be a cause of it".  A 2014 survey of 13- to 17-year-old Americans found that 90% "felt pressured by fashion and media industries to be skinny", and that 65% believed that the bodies portrayed were too thin. More than 60% habitually compared themselves to models, and 46% strove to resemble models' bodies.

According to Dove's Global Beauty And Confidence report, "a total of 71% of women and 67% of girls want to call on the media to do a better job portraying women of diverse physical appearance, age, race, shape and size." In addition, 67% of men now strongly believe that it is unacceptable for brands to use photo manipulation techniques to alter the body image of a model.

In response, the fashion magazine industry has made efforts to include 'real' women, and to reduce or ban the use of airbrushing tools. Likewise, fashion brands and retailers adopt vanity sizing in their assortments to intentionally raise a customer's self-esteem while shopping in stores. This involves labeling clothes with smaller sizes than the actual cut of the items, to trick and attract the consumer.

Fashion models themselves have experienced negative body image due to industry pressures: 69% were told to tone up, while 62% reported that their agencies had required them to lose weight or change their body shapes. 54% of models revealed that they would be dropped by their agencies if they failed to comply.  Models frequently have underweight body mass index (BMI): a study published in the International Journal of Eating Disorders discovered that a majority of models had a BMI of 17.41, which qualifies as anorexia.  In the past twenty years, runway models have also transformed from a typical size 6–8 to 0–2. The average weight of an American model was recorded to be twenty-three percent less than an average American woman. In 2006, the fashion industry came under fire due to the untimely deaths of two models, Luisel Ramos and Ana Carolina Reston, both of whom had suffered from eating disorders and been severely underweight. Other models endure intensive exercise regimes, diets, fasts, and detoxes; in order to maintain or lose weight. In addition, 17% have admitted to stimulant abuse, while another 8% frequently engaged in self-induced vomiting to induce weight loss.

Attempts to improve 

Various jurisdictions have taken steps to protect models and promulgate healthier body image.  The UK and US have pursued social education campaigns. Spain, Italy, Brazil, and Israel prohibit models from working with a BMI below 18.5. France similarly forbids the employment of extremely skinny models, and requires medical certificates to verify their health.

France is also working on ensuring retailers specify when an image is airbrushed in magazines, websites, and advertisements, although it is unclear whether consumers are already aware of digital retouching techniques.

Some brands voluntarily promote better body images. Fashion conglomerates Kering and LVMH recently "announced that they will no longer hire models smaller than a U.S. size 2". in hopes of improving the working conditions of models and inspiring others to follow suit. Critics have objected that to ban size-zero models from working constitutes discrimination or thin-shaming. Moreover, the announcement of a small minimum dress size, which does not fit the average body type of most countries, continues to "send the message that super slim body types is the 'ideal'".

Plus-size models are slowly emerging in mainstream media, which may improve body image. Prominent plus-size models include Ashley Graham, the face of popular plus-size retailer Lane Bryant, and Iskra Lawrence, a classified role model for lingerie and swimwear retailer aerie. Christian Siriano cast five plus-size models for his New York Fashion Week shows. Siriano also made global headlines after he designed a gown for plus-sized actress Leslie Jones when other designers would not.

Models have notably used Instagram as a tool to "encourage self-acceptance, fight back against body-shamers, and post plenty of selfies celebrating their figure".  In the U.S., a group of plus-size models launched the #DearNYFW campaign, which targeted the fashion industry's harmful approach towards their bodies. This movement was broadcast across different social media platforms, with other models using the hashtag to share their experiences, in hopes of persuading the American fashion industry to start "prioritizing health and celebrate diversity on the runway".

Fashion photographer Tarik Carroll released a photo series titled the EveryMAN Project to showcase large-framed queer and transgender men of color, with the purpose of "challenging hyper-masculinity and gender norms, while bringing body-positivity to the forefront".

The lack of fashion-forward plus-size clothing in the fashion industry has given rise to the #PlusIsEqual movement. High-street brands such as Forever 21 and ASOS have increased plus-size product offerings. Other brands include Victoria Beckham's, who plans to release a range of high-street clothing with sizes up to XXXL, and Nike, which expanded its plus-size collection sizes 1X to 3X. In response to the criticism that the term plus-size caused unnecessary labeling, Kmart replaced its numerical sizing with positive tags such as, "lovely" and "fabulous" instead.

Another tactic to promote body positivity has been to protest against photo retouching.  In 2014, the Aarie Real campaign promised to display "campaign spreads and brand imagery with stomach rolls, gapless thighs and other perceived flaws that would normally have been edited out of the ads". Neon Moon, a feminist lingerie brand from London, advocates the beauty of flaws, instead of the need to retouch its models for aesthetic purposes. Campaigns often feature a range of "diverse models and lack of airbrushing as a marketing tool". U.S. e-tailer ModCloth explored other methods, such as employing its own staff as models for its swimwear collection.

Social media 
Beauty standards are being enforced and shaped by social media. Users are constantly bombarded by notifications, posts, and photos about the lives of others, "sending messages about what we could, should, or would be if we only purchased certain products, made certain choices, or engaged in certain behaviors". Despite the ability to create and control content on social media, the online environment still enforces the same beauty standards that traditional media promoted. Over-engagement with social networking platforms and images will lead to unattainable ideas of beauty standards which ultimately results in low self-esteem and body image issues.

A study by the Florida Health Experience found that "87% of women and 65% of men compare their bodies to images they consume on social and traditional media." They also found that users felt like they got more positive attention towards their body if they altered it in some way. A study by the University of South Australia discovered that individuals who frequently uploaded or viewed appearance-related items were more likely to internalize the thin ideal.

Applications such as Instagram have become a "body-image battleground", while the "selfie" is now the universal lens which individuals use to criticize their bodies and others. Facebook and Snapchat also allow users to receive appearance approvals and community acceptance through the ratio of views, comments, and likes. Since individuals who use social media platforms often only display the high points of their lives, a survey by Common Sense Media reported that 22% felt bad if their posts were ignored, or if they did not receive the amount of attention they had hoped for. Instagram is ranked at the most detrimental to mental health according to a study done by the Royal Society for Mental Health. The increased use of body and facial reshaping applications such as Snapchat and Facetune has been identified as a potential cause of body dysmorphia. Social media apps that have body altering filters contribute to body image issues which most often result in eating disorders and body dysmorphia. Recently, a phenomenon referred to as 'Snapchat dysmorphia' has been used to describe people who request surgery to look like the edited versions of themselves as they appear through Snapchat Filters.

Many users digitally manipulate the self-portraits they post to social media. According to research by the Renfrew Center Foundation, 50% of men and 70% of 18 to 35-year-old women edited their images before uploading. 35% of respondents were also actively concerned about being tagged in unattractive photos, while 27% fretted about their appearances online.

Reports have also shown that the messages delivered by "fitspiration" websites are sometimes identical to the "thinspiration" or pro-anorexia types. This is evident through "language inducing guilt about weight or the body, and promoted dieting". The marketing of restrictive diets to young women as a form of self care can cause "increasingly disordered eating", and orthorexia, an obsession with the right and wrong types of food.

In an international study of social media apps, photo-based social media apps, predominately Facebook, Instagram and Snapchat, are found to have a negative impact on the body image of men more than non photo-based social media apps.

Unrealistic beauty standards 
On the other hand, social media has created unrealistic beauty standards. Many individuals are mentally and physically struggling to keep a healthy mind and body. Men and women often harm themselves by trying all sorts of diets or taking all sorts of pills to look like their favorite influencers and celebrities, unfortunately often times the look of the people they idealized is the result of medical procedures. In fact, more and more influencers and celebrities change the way they look, with the help of medical procedures. For example, the “plump lip” trend appeared years ago advertised by celebrities which resulted in an increase of 759% in botox procedures since the 2000s. We can also notice that the images that are posted every day on social media are idealized and unrealistic resulting from society's unreasonably high expectations.

Attempts to improve 
In an attempt to tackle such issues, the UK launched a national campaign called Be Real, after findings showed 76% of secondary school students who learnt about body confidence in class felt more positive about themselves. The goal of this movement was thus to improve body confidence through educational resources provided to schools, and persuading the media, businesses, and the diet industry to endorse different body shapes and sizes instead.

Social media platforms such as Instagram have banned the use of "thinspiration and "thinspo" related hashtags. Other solutions include the promotion of hashtags such as #SelfLove and #BodyPositivity, and the promotion of "transformation photos", side-by-side images displaying an individual's fitness or weight-loss progress, which users have utilized to showcase the deceptiveness of social media. In an effort to alleviate eating disorders, Eating Disorder Hope launched the Pro-Recovery Movement, a live Twitter chat encouraging sufferers to celebrate self-love and a positive body image, through recovery subject matters.

Project HEAL introduced a campaign called #WhatMakesMeBeautiful, with the aim of celebrating admirable attributes other than appearance.

There have been recent demands for social media sites to highlight photos that have been edited and prevent universal publication. 

Companies in France who want to avoid a fine must label their post if the image has been altered for enhancement.

Measurement 
Body image can be measured by asking a subject to rate their current and ideal body shape using a series of depictions. The difference between these two values is the measure of body dissatisfaction.

There are currently more than 40 "instruments" used to measure body image. All of these instruments can be put into three categories: figure preferences, video projection techniques, and questionnaires. Because there are so many ways to measure body image, it is difficult to draw meaningful research generalizations. Many factors have to be taken into account when measuring body image, including gender, ethnicity, culture, and age.

Figure rating scales 
One of the most prominent measures of body image is Figure Rating Scales, which present a series of body images graded from thin to muscular or from thin to obese. The subject is asked to indicate which figure best represents their current perceived body, and which represents their ideal or desired body. Bodies depicted in figure rating scales are either hand-drawn silhouettes, computer rendered images, or photographic images.

Video projection techniques 
One study showed each participant a series of images of himself or herself with either increased weight or decreased weight. Each participant was asked to respond to the pictures, and their startle and eyeblink response were measured. "Objective, psychophysiological measures, like the affect modulated startle eyeblink response, are less subject to reporting bias."

Questionnaires 
BASS is a 9-item subscale of the Multidimensional Body-Self Relations Questionnaire. It uses a rating scale from −2 to +2 and assesses eight body areas and attributes and overall appearance (face, hair, lower torso, mid-torso, upper torso, muscle tone, height, and weight).

Questionnaires can have confounding variable responses. For instance, "Acquiescent response style (ARS), or the tendency to agree with items on a survey, is more common among individuals from Asian and African cultures."

Body size and shape misperception 
As well as being dissatisfied with their body sizes, exposure to idealized images of thin bodies is associated with overestimation of one's own body size. Recent research suggests that this exposure to images of thin bodies may cause a recalibration of the visual perceptual mechanisms that represent body size in the brain, such that the observer sees subsequently-viewed bodies, including their own bodies, as heavier than they really are, a process known as "visual adaptation". There is evidence that individuals who are less satisfied with their bodies may spend a disproportionate amount of time directing their visual attention towards unusually thin bodies, resulting in an even greater overestimation of the size of subsequently-viewed bodies. Further evidence suggests that a similar mechanism may be at play in people (particularly young men) who underestimate their muscularity, such as those suffering from muscle dysmorphia. The nature of the interaction between body size and shape misperception and body dissatisfaction is not yet fully understood, however.

See also

References

Further reading 

 Blakeslee, S. "Out-of-Body Experience? Your Brain is to Blame". The New York Times, October 3, 2006.

 
 
 

 Ramachandran, V.S. A Brief Tour of Human Consciousness. New York: Pearson Education, 2004.

 Sacks, Oliver. The Man Who Mistook His Wife for a Hat. New York: Simon & Schuster, 1985.
 Sherrington, C. S. The Integrated Action of the Nervous System. C Scribner's Sons, 1906.

 
 

 

Body image in popular culture
Body shape
Feminism and sexuality
Feminist theory
Human appearance
Self
Sexualization